A constitutional referendum was held in Uruguay on 30 November 1958 alongside general elections. Two proposals for amendments to the constitution were put to voters, but both were rejected.

Proposals
Proposal 1 was put forward by the Ruralista/Herrerista faction of the National Party through the General Assembly, and proposed a presidential system of government, separating the presidential and parliamentary elections, and abolishing the lema system.

Proposal 2 was put forward by the Civic Union through a popular initiative, and proposed introducing a presidential system of government.

Results

References

1958 referendums
1958 in Uruguay
Referendums in Uruguay
Constitutional referendums in Uruguay
November 1958 events in South America